The 2020 North Carolina lieutenant gubernatorial election took place on November 3, 2020, to elect the Lieutenant Governor of North Carolina, concurrently with the 2020 U.S. presidential election, as well as elections to the United States Senate and elections to the United States House of Representatives and various state and local elections. Primary elections were held on March 3, 2020.

In North Carolina, the Governor and Lieutenant Governor are elected separately.

Incumbent Republican Lieutenant Governor Dan Forest was re-elected to a second term in 2016, despite Republican Governor Pat McCrory losing reelection by a narrow margin. Forest was ineligible to run for a third term due to term limits established by the Constitution of North Carolina. He instead unsuccessfully ran for Governor.

The Republican Party nominated businessman Mark Robinson (who was running for public office for the first time), and the Democratic Party nominated state representative Yvonne Lewis Holley. No matter who won, North Carolina would elect its first African-American lieutenant governor. Robinson narrowly won the general election, even while Democratic incumbent Gov. Roy Cooper won re-election.

Republican primary

Candidates

Nominee
Mark Robinson, businessman

Eliminated in primary
Buddy Bengel, North Carolina Education Lottery commissioner
Deborah Cochran, former mayor of Mount Airy
Renee Ellmers, former U.S. Representative for North Carolina's 2nd congressional district
Greg Gebhardt, North Carolina National Guardsman and U.S. Army veteran
Mark Johnson, North Carolina Superintendent of Public Instruction
John L. Ritter, attorney
Scott Stone, former state representative
Andy Wells, state senator

Declined
Mark Brody, state representative
Jim Puckett, Mecklenburg County commissioner
Mark Walker, incumbent U.S. Representative for North Carolina's 6th congressional district

Polling

Results

Democratic primary

Candidates

Nominee
Yvonne Lewis Holley, state representative

Eliminated in primary
Chaz Beasley, state representative
Ron Newton, candidate for lieutenant governor in 2016
Allen Thomas, Hoke County commissioner
Bill Toole, environmental attorney, former Belmont city councilman, and former chairman of the Gaston County Democratic Party
Terry Van Duyn, state senator

Withdrawn
Cal Cunningham, former state senator (ran for the U.S. Senate)

Polling

Results

Because no candidate in the Democratic primary won more than 30 percent of the vote, second-place finisher Terry Van Duyn was entitled to call for a runoff, or "second primary," if she chose to do so. However, Van Duyn chose not to call for a runoff, and Yvonne Holley was awarded the Democratic nomination.

General election

Campaign

Robinson controversy
The Republican nominee attracted controversy in September as a result of his social media posts alleging negative Jewish influence in Hollywood, among other complaints.  He claimed that the movie Black Panther was "created by an agnostic Jew and put to film by satanic marxist [sic]. How can this trash, that was only created to pull the shekels out of your Schvartze pockets, invoke any pride?"  He also mischaracterized former first lady Michelle Obama as male and her husband Barack Obama as an atheist.  Robinson stood by his comments in a September interview with Raleigh news station WRAL, stating, "I don’t back up from them a bit. May hurt some people’s feelings, some things that people may not like, but those are my personal opinions."

Endorsements

Polling
Graphical summary

Results

Notes

References

External links
 
 
  (State affiliate of the U.S. League of Women Voters)
 

Official campaign websites
 Yvonne Lewis Holley (D) for Lt. Governor 
 Mark Robinson (R) for Lt. Governor

2020
Lieutenant Governor
North Carolina